Strigatella pudica is a species of sea snail, a marine gastropod mollusk in the family Mitridae, the miters or miter snails.

Description

Distribution
This marine species occurs in the Mascarene Basin.

References

 Drivas, J.; Jay, M. (1987). Coquillages de La Réunion et de l'Île Maurice. Collection Les Beautés de la Nature. Delachaux et Niestlé: Neuchâtel. . 159 pp.

External links
 Gastropods.com: Mitra (Subgenus 2) pudica

Mitridae
Gastropods described in 1860